Meppen is an unincorporated community in Calhoun County, Illinois, United States. Meppen is north of Brussels. St. Joseph's Cemetery is located in Meppen.

History
The community was named after the city of Meppen in the Northwest of Germany.

Notable person
Roman Catholic Bishop Victor Hermann Balke was born in Meppen.

References

External links

Unincorporated communities in Calhoun County, Illinois
Unincorporated communities in Illinois